This is a discography of American singer Jackie Wilson.

Albums

Studio albums
{| class="wikitable plainrowheaders" style="text-align:center;"
|-
! rowspan="2" |Title
! rowspan="2" |Year
! colspan="2" |Peak chart positions
|-
! style="width:3em;font-size:85%"| US
! style="width:3em;font-size:85%"| USR&B
|-
! scope="row"| He's So Fine
| 1958
| —
| rowspan="14" 
|-
! scope="row"| Lonely Teardrops
| 1959
| —
|-
! scope="row"| So Much
| 1959
| —
|-
! scope="row"| Jackie Sings the Blues
| 1960
| —
|-
! scope="row"| A Woman, a Lover, a Friend
| 1960
| —
|-
! scope="row"| You Ain't Heard Nothin' Yet
| 1961
| —
|-
! scope="row"| By Special Request
| 1961
| —
|-
! scope="row"| Body and Soul
| 1962
| —
|-
! scope="row"| Jackie Wilson at the Copa
| 1962
| —
|-
! scope="row"| Jackie Wilson Sings the World's Greatest Melodies
| 1963
| —
|-
! scope="row"| Baby Workout
| 1963
| 78
|-
! scope="row"| Shake a Hand (with Linda Hopkins)
| 1963
| —
|-
! scope="row"| Merry Christmas from Jackie Wilson
| 1963
| —
|-
! scope="row"| Somethin' Else!
| 1964
| —
|-
! scope="row"| Soul Time
| 1965
| —
| —
|-
! scope="row"| Spotlight on Jackie Wilson!
| 1965
| —
| —
|-
! scope="row"| Whispers
| 1966
| 108
| 15
|-
! scope="row"| Higher and Higher
| 1967
| 163
| 28
|-
! scope="row"| Manufacturers of Soul (with Count Basie)
| 1968
| —
| —
|-
! scope="row"| I Get the Sweetest Feeling
| 1968
| —
| —
|-
! scope="row"| Do Your Thing
| 1968
| —
| 50
|-
! scope="row"| This Love is Real
| 1970
| —
| —
|-
! scope="row"| You Got Me Walkin| 1971
| —
| —
|-
! scope="row"| Beautiful Day
| 1973
| —
| —
|-
! scope="row"| Nowstalgia
| 1974
| —
| —
|-
! scope="row"| Nobody But You
| 1976
| —
| —
|-
| colspan="7" style="text-align:center; font-size:9pt;"| "—" denotes releases that did not chart.
|}

Compilation albums
1960: My Golden Favorites
1963: My Golden Favorites, Vol. 2
1966: Soul Galore
1969: Jackie Wilson's Greatest Hits (#43 R&B)
1983: The Jackie Wilson Story
1987: The Very Best of Jackie Wilson (re-released in 1993)
1992: Mr. Excitement!
2005: The Essential Jackie Wilson
2006: The Ultimate Jackie Wilson
2019: Gold

Singles
1950s

1960s

1970s*''' - Through a period between November 1963 and January 1965, Billboard didn't publish an R&B chart. Ratings from Cash Box Top 50 in R&B Locations chart.''

Billboard Year-End performances

Notes

References

Discographies of American artists
Rhythm and blues discographies
Rock music discographies
Soul music discographies